The Dark sea catfish (Cathorops melanopus) is a species of catfish in the family Ariidae. It was described by Albert Günther in 1864. It is a tropical, freshwater catfish which occurs in Guatemala.

References

Ariidae
Fish described in 1864
Taxa named by Albert Günther